This article provides an overview of education in Wales from early childhood to university and adult skills. Largely state funded and free-at-the-point-of-use at a primary and secondary level, education is compulsory for children in Wales aged five to sixteen years old. It differs to some extent in structure and content to other parts of the United Kingdom, in the later case particularly in relation to the teaching of the Welsh language.

State funded nursery education is typically offered from age three. Children usually enter fulltime primary school at age four, enter secondary school at age eleven and take their GCSEs at age 16. After that, young people have the option of staying at school to study A-levels or enrolling in further education. From the age of 18, they might enroll at university.

The development of Education in Wales was historically closely linked to its development in England. Previously an elite concern, schooling became accessible to a growing segment of the population between the 16th and 19th centuries. In the late 1800s, compulsory education was introduced for young children before being expanded into adolescence over the following decades. At the end of the 20th century, education was mostly placed under the control of the devolved Welsh Government.

History

Pre-devolution 
Wales has been part of the Kingdom of England and its successors since medieval times, and historically had no distinct legal status in the United Kingdom as for instance Scotland had. Thus throughout most of the 20th century and earlier, the development of education in Wales was closely aligned to its development in England. In the Middle Ages, the vast majority of people had no access to education, with mainly boys of the landowning classes attending the few schools that did exist. But by the 16th century a growing class of traders wanted education for their sons, and some grammar schools were set up to serve this demand. During the Commonwealth of England, sixty "free schools" were set up in Wales. Though little is known about these institutions and they disappeared after the restoration of the monarchy, they represent an early experiment in providing education to a wider section of society. By the end of the 17th century, a network of religious charity schools taught both boys and girls in the Welsh as well as English languages.

At the start of the 19th century, schooling in England and Wales was provided on a haphazard basis by private business, charity and the church. This system saw many children from less wealthy families, in particular, receive a low quality of education and in 1800 around half of people were illiterate. From the early 1800s onwards the state increasingly provided financing for education. During the mid-1800s a report into unrest in Wales recommended that use of the Welsh language be cut back in schools. This led to the practice of the Welsh Not which involved children being beaten and stigmatised for speaking Welsh in school. This practice was widespread in some Welsh counties in the middle of the 19th century, though it was never official government policy and the schools where it took place were voluntary at that time, so acted with the endorsement of parents. In 1870 the Elementary Education Act legislated for the creation of a system of state funded schools. Ten years later education became compulsory for five- to ten-year-old children and all school fees at elementary schools were abolished eleven years after that. Over the following decades, compulsory education was steadily expanded into adolescence, until by 1971 the school leaving age was 16.

Development of distinctive governance 

In 1896 the Central Welsh Board was formed, responsible for the inspection of grammar schools in Wales. The Welsh Intermediate Education Act 1889 was brought about to "make further provision for the intermediate and technical education of the inhabitants of Wales and the county of Monmouth." and was responsible for inspection of secondary schools. In 1907, the Welsh department of the Board of Education was formed and in the same year, a Welsh Inspectorate was established for inspection of primary and secondary schools in Wales.

In 1944, during the Winston Churchill war ministry government, The Central Advisory Council for Education (Wales) was formed and became responsible for advising the Minister of Education of the UK government on education in Wales following the Education Act 1944. Additionally, the act made it possible for Welsh-medium schools to be funded by the state for the first time. The first state school of this type was opened in Llanelli in 1947 and there were ten such institutions within two years.

In 1948,  the WJEC was formed, which was a consortium of Local Education Authorities in Wales. The WJEC replaced the Central Welsh Board (formed in 1896) and is still the largest awarding body in Wales today.

In 1970, the governance of Primary and secondary education in Wales was placed under the control of the UK government's Welsh Office. In 1978 control of training, qualifications, supply, and teacher pay and pensions were also transferred to the Welsh Office. In the late 20th century, the office began some of the reforms which would continue into the era of devolution, such as making Welsh a universal part of the curriculum for children aged five to fourteen years in 1990. In 1993, the Curriculum Cymraig was introduced with the intention of adding more of an emphasis on the cultural life and society of Wales into the curriculum. However, a report produced by Estyn in 2001 suggested that the success of this endeavour had been quite limited and varied significantly between subjects, schools and regions.

Devolution era 
Following the victory of the Labour party in the 1997 general election, the new government enacted its policy of giving significant governing powers to elected bodies based in Scotland and Wales. Referendums were held on this matter later that year which passed in Wales by a narrow margin, and two years later the first elections to these institutions were held. The Welsh Assembly, which later became the Welsh Parliament, lacked legislative powers to begin with, but did control many public services including education.

Since devolution, education policy in the four constituent countries of the UK has diverged: for example, England has pursued reforms based on diversity of school types and parental choice; Wales (and Scotland) remain more committed to the concept of the community-based comprehensive school. Systems of governance and regulation – the arrangements for planning, funding, quality-assuring and regulating learning, and for its local administration – are becoming increasingly differentiated across the four home countries. Education researcher David Reynolds claimed in 2008 that policy in Wales was driven by a "producerist" paradigm emphasising collaboration between educational partners. He also alludes to lower funding in Welsh schools compared to England, echoing similar concerns at university level. He concludes that performance data did not suggest that Wales had improved more rapidly than England, although there were considerable difficulties in making these kinds of assessments.

Since 5 May 2010, the terms local education authority and children's services authority have been repealed and replaced by the single term 'local authority' in both primary and secondary legislation.

Curriculum changes 
Changes in the years immediately following devolution included compulsory study of the Welsh language for students up to the age of 16 and the removal of statutory testing for children in the middle years of their schooling (though it was later reintroduced).

From 2008 to 2011 the foundation phase was introduced for three- to seven-year-olds in Wales, a curriculum which was designed to focus on a child's developmental needs and emphasised the importance of play and direct experiences for learning in this age group. A 2015 report into the rollout of the phase found that it was associated with improved attainment, including in the later years of primary school after its completion.

The Curriculum and Assessment (Wales) Act 2021 was passed in 2021, which established new curriculum requirements for all learners aged 3 to 16 in maintained or funded non-maintained nursery education. The new curriculum is designed to include more emphasise on skills and experiences as well as knowledge. The curriculum groups education into six "Areas of Learning and Experience" with the intention of helping teachers draw links between subjects and teach topics in a broad way though traditional subjects will still be taught. Within a basic framework of goals and learning areas, it give schools freedom to develop their own curriculum to suit the needs of their pupils. Other changes include a greater emphasis on the history of Wales and ethnic minority groups which reports by Estyn in previous years suggested had often been poor along with the removal of parents right to take their children out of sex education classes.

Structure

Early years care and education 

From the start of the January, April or September (whichever comes soonest) following a child's third birthday they become eligible for a minimum of ten hours a week in publicly funded nursery education. Nursery lessons are focused on developing children's abilities in a variety of areas such as creativity, communication and general knowledge however, at this age, learning to read and write is not yet considered a priority. Depending on their parents economic and employment status children in this age-range may be eligible for up to twenty additional hours of state-subsidised childcare each week.

According to statistics for the 2021/2022 school year most state-funded primary schools in Wales and all separate infant schools included nursery provision. There were also eight separate nursery schools which are owned and run by the Local authority. The hours of state-funded childcare a child is entitled to can also be provided by other childcare facilities. According to a 2018 report, there were 4,012 such facilities registered in 2016, it also noted that "The majority of childcare providers are childminders (52%). The remaining childcare provision is delivered by sessional day care settings (20%), full day care settings (17%), out of school care settings (10%), open access play provision (1%) and crèches (0.5%)."

The Welsh government is planning to introduce universal state funded childcare for two-year-old children by the mid-2020s. Currently, only the most disadvantaged toddlers in this age group and those in some more deprived areas are entitled to 12.5 hours of care provided by the state.

Compulsory schooling

A child's age on 1 September determines the point of entry into the relevant stage of education.  Education is compulsory beginning with the term following the child's fifth birthday, but may take place at either home or school.  Most parents choosing to educate through school-based provision, however, enrol their children in the reception year in September of that school year, with most children thus beginning school at age four or four and a half.  This age was traditionally much earlier than in most other Western nations, but in recent years many European countries have lowered their age of compulsory education, usually by making one or more years of kindergarten compulsory.

Primary education

In 2014/15, there were 1,330 primary schools in Wales with 273,400 pupils and 12,240 full-time equivalent (FTE) teachers. The teacher/pupil ratio was 1:22 and the average class size was 26 pupils. In 2015/16, there were 276,950 pupils in 1,310 primary schools – a rise of 3,550 since 2014/15.

In 2014/15, there were 435 Welsh-medium primary schools with 65,460 pupils, rising from 64,366 in 2013/14, but the number of Welsh-medium primary schools decreased from 444, due primarily to the closure of small rural schools.

Universal free school meals were introduced in Wales for children in the first year of primary school in September 2022. They are planned to be rolled out for all primary school children by 2024.

Secondary education

Children typically transfer from primary to secondary school between schools years six and seven, when they are 11 years old. In school year nine (or sometimes eight), pupils receive a chose of what subjects to continue their studies in, options must be available across multiple fields but vary between schools. Maths, English, Science and Welsh as a first or second language are compulsory whilst some schools may also make other subjects compulsory.

Pupils in secondary school take part in the compulsory GCSE and the non-compulsory A-level or BTEC qualifications at ages 15/16 and 17/18 respectively. Since 2007 the Welsh Baccalaureate Qualification has also been available as an option although it was ungraded until 2015.

In 2014/15 there were 207 secondary schools (a drop of six since 2013/14) in Wales with 182,408 pupils and 11,269 FTE teachers (a drop of 310 since 2013/14). The pupil/teacher ratio was 17:1, which has remained largely the same since 2000/01. In 2015/16, there were 178,650 pupils in 205 secondary schools – a drop of 3,700 since 2014/15. The same report found that in 2015/16, there were 8,000 pupils in 34 independent schools, 4,540 pupils in 32 independent special schools, and 730 pupils in 25 pupil referral units.

In 2014/15, there were 50 Welsh-medium secondary (a drop of 2 since 2013/14) schools with 36,485 pupils, dropping from 37,400 in 2013/14. In the same year, there were 4 Welsh-medium middle schools (a rise of 2 since 2013/14) with 2,448 pupils, a rise from 1,577 in 2013/14.

In 2016, 60.3% of Year 11 pupils (aged 16) achieved the Level 2 inclusive threshold (Level 2 including a grade A*-C in English or Welsh first language and Mathematics). 35.6% of pupils eligible for FSM (free school meals) achieved the L2 inclusive threshold. 66.9% of pupils achieved A*-C in maths. 70.4% of pupils achieved A*-C in either English or Welsh first language.

Wales has often performed poorly in PISA results, which compare the academic abilities of adolescents around the world. The 2018 tests saw Wales' results improving but remaining the weakest of the four education systems of the UK in all subjects.

Further education

Further education (FE) includes full- and part-time learning for people over compulsory school age, excluding higher education. Young people often enrol in FE as an alternative to staying at school after the age of 16. FE and publicly funded training in Wales is provided by 15 FE institutions in 2014/15 and a range of public, private and voluntary sector training providers, such as the Workers' Educational Association. Colleges vary in size and mission, and include general FE, tertiary and specialist institutions, including one Roman Catholic Sixth Form College and a residential adult education college. Many colleges offer leisure learning and training programmes designed to meet the needs of business. In 2014/15 there were 263,315 FE students in Wales spanning the entire availability of FE at multiple placements, including FE, HE (higher education), LA (local authority) Community, and work-based learning.

Adult community learning
Adult Community learning is a form of adult education or lifelong learning delivered and supported by local authorities in Wales. Programmes can be formal or informal, non-accredited or accredited, and vocational, academic or leisure orientated. In 2018–2019, there were 23,970 learners in Local Authority Community Learning.

Higher education

Students normally enter higher education (HE) from 18 onwards. Undergraduate students contribute £9,000 a year in fees, and are generally entitled to student loans and grants depending on their family's economic situation for maintenance. The state does not control syllabi, but it does influence admission procedures and monitors standards through the Higher Education Funding Council for Wales.

In England, Wales and Northern Ireland all qualifications can be compared on a scale beginning with entry level and then followed by eight numbered levels, 1 is the equivalent of a weaker pass grade at GCSE and 8 the equivalent of a doctorate. Undergraduate degrees typically the first higher education qualifications available are usually level 4, 5 or 6. Students will generally need A-Levels or an equivalent at a certain grade to enroll on them but may be able to do a foundation year prior to starting if their grades are weaker. There are various types of undergraduate degree but the most common is a Bachelor's degree which generally takes three years to complete and involves studying one or sometimes two subjects in detail. It is a level 6 qualification.

A postgraduate degree is a level 7 or 8 qualification. It can typically only be completed after an undergraduate degree has been completed. It is generally focused on a more specific topic rather than the more general subject taught at undergraduate level. These generally come in two types the "taught" degree which conducted more in the style of an undergraduate degree and "research" degree where the student directs their own study of a self-chosen question in a more independent manner. A master's degree is the highest level of qualification.

In 2014/15 there were 145,735 enrolments at HE institutions in Wales, including 97,900 first degree and other undergraduates and 27,780 postgraduates. Welsh HE institutions had a total of 10,140 full-time and part-time staff.

Governance

Local administration and individual schools 
Unlike in England, where state schools are increasingly run in an Academy model where they are funded directly by the central government, state schools in Wales are overseen by local authorities. Local authority funded or maintained schools come in various different models. The Community school is owned and run by the local authority, the Voluntary controlled schools is owned by a charity with close oversight from the local authority, the Voluntary aided school is owned by a charity with a greater degree of self-governance and the Foundation school is owned by a governing body or charity organisation with limited local authority oversight. In the second and third case the charity is usually a religious organisation, typically the Church in Wales or the Roman Catholic Church.

The curriculum being rolled out in Wales from 2022 onwards is intended to give individual schools more control over the instruction they provide and the autonomy to develop their own curricula within a basic set of guidelines.

Education Consortia 
In 2014, there were four formal education consortia in Wales covering:
 North Wales (GwE) (Flintshire, Conwy, Wrexham, Gwynedd, Isle of Anglesey, Denbighshire)
 South West and Mid Wales (ERW) (Swansea, Neath Port Talbot, Carmarthenshire, Pembrokeshire, Powys, Ceredigion)
 Central South Wales (CSC) (Bridgend, Cardiff, Merthyr Tydfil, Rhondda Cynon Taff, Vale of Glamorgan)
 South East Wales (EAS) (Caerphilly, Monmouthshire, Newport, Blaenau Gwent, Torfaen)
The role of Education Consortia is to assist in school improvement in their respective regions. This includes areas such as the effectiveness of schools leadership, the quality of their teaching and pupils results. The South West and Mid Wales Consortia partially broke down in 2020 with Powys, Ceredigion and Neath Port Talbot all leaving. The former two councils then formed an informal partnership whilst Neath Port Talbot remained outside the Consortia system as of March 2022.

Welsh government oversight and Wales-wide institutions 
The governance of education has been devolved in Wales since the creation of the Welsh assembly in 1999 along with other related policy areas such as Welsh language policy and local government. This has led to the creation of a somewhat distinctive education system. Wales has its own education inspectorate, qualifications regulator and curriculum.

UK government role and UK-wide institutions 
The money the Welsh government has to spend in devolved areas is broadly pegged to money the UK government spends in equivalent areas in England through a system called the Barnett formula. However, the devolved administrations are not obliged to spend the money they receive in the same policy area as it was spent in England (e.g. the equivalent to money spent on health in England could be spent on education in Wales). More broadly Wales's and the other UK education systems are all influenced by their interactions with reserved matters and coexistence within the United Kingdom.

Welsh language 

A significant minority of students in Wales are educated either wholly or largely through the medium of Welsh: in 2014/15, 15.7% of children and young people received Welsh-medium education – a drop from the 15.9% in 2010/11. An additional 10% attend schools in which significant portion of the curriculum is bilingual.  The study of the Welsh language is available to all age groups through nurseries, schools, colleges and universities and in adult education. The study of the language is compulsory for all pupils in State Schools until the age of 16.

Educational institutions have flexibility over how much English children are taught prior to the age of seven. This is in order to allow Welsh medium schools and nurseries to immerse young children in the language as much as possible. In the later years of primary school, the curriculum at Welsh medium schools continues to be mostly (70% or more) taught in Welsh whilst at secondary level all subjects other than English are taught in Welsh. However, as they get older, students in Welsh medium education are required to work towards the same tests and qualifications in the English language as their counterparts who were primarily educated in English.

See also

 Education
 Education in the United Kingdom
 List of education articles by country

Aspects 
Home education in the United Kingdom
Primary education in Wales
Secondary education in Wales

Elsewhere in the UK 

Education in England
Education in Northern Ireland
Education in Scotland

References

External links
Hwb - Homepage of the Welsh government's website on education.
EDUCATION SYSTEM IN THE UK - 2013 UK Government document covering education across the UK. Includes detailed information related to Wales. May now be somewhat out of date.
History of devolution - Welsh Parliament website page covering the history of Welsh Devolution and governing arrangements for Wales more generally. 
Royal Commission on the Ancient and Historical Monuments of Wales in English and Welsh
Welsh FE Colleges